Faye Toogood (born 1977) is a British designer based in London. She started her career working as an editor and stylist at The World of Interiors before founding her own studio in 2008. Her work spans furniture, interiors, and fashion.

Toogood is known for her minimal, sculptural furniture designs. For example, Roly-Poly Chair, which is ubiquitous in the contemporary design scene, and is held in several museum collections. The chair consists of a scooped seat with four plinth legs. In the recent years, Toogood has diversified her style, methodology and medium. Her 2020 exhibition Assemblage 6: Unlearning included maquettes to illustrate the process of developing her work. In addition she has worked on interior design projects as well as fashion collaborations with companies such as Birkenstock. A monograph on her work, Faye Toogood: Drawing, Material, Sculpture, Landscape, was published by Phaidon Press in 2022.

Collections
Toogood's work is held in the permanent collections of the Philadelphia Museum of Art; the High Museum of Art, Atlanta; Corning Museum of Glass; the National Gallery of Victoria, Melbourne; Dallas Museum of Art; the RISD Museum, Providence; and the Denver Museum of Art, amongst other venues.

In 2023, her work was included in the exhibition Mirror Mirror: Reflections on Design at Chatsworth at Chatsworth House.

References

External links
Toogood Website

Living people
Alumni of the University of Bristol
British furniture designers
21st-century English women artists
1977 births
21st-century English artists